Panoramic 34 is a restaurant and bar located on the 34th floor of West Tower, Liverpool. It is 300 feet above ground and claims to be 'one of the UK's highest restaurants' with views as far away as North Wales.

External links
 Panoramic Restaurant
 Images from Liverpool Pictorial
 Liverpool Daily Echo article
 Liverpool Daily Echo article
 Review from The Guardian newspaper

Restaurants in Merseyside
Buildings and structures in Liverpool